Gareth Wissing (born 28 August 1995) is a South African professional cricketer. He made his List A debut for KwaZulu-Natal in the 2016–17 CSA Provincial One-Day Challenge on 9 October 2016. He made his first-class debut for KwaZulu-Natal in the 2016–17 Sunfoil 3-Day Cup on 20 October 2016.

References

External links
 

1995 births
Living people
South African cricketers
KwaZulu-Natal cricketers
Place of birth missing (living people)